Maasai Mara University (MMU), (formerly Narok University College), is a public university in Kenya.

Location
The geographical coordinates of the university campus are 01°05'35.0"S, 35°51'28.0"E (Latitude:-1.093056; Longitude:35.857778). The university's main campus measures an estimated .

Overview
MMU is accredited by the Commission for University Education of Kenya. The institution was founded on 16 July 2008 as Narok University College, a constituent college of Moi University. In 2013 it rebranded as Maasai Mara University.

Academics
The following academic courses are offered at Maasai Mara University:

Undergraduate
As of May 2021, the university offers the following undergraduate degree courses.

 Bachelor of Arts (Community Development)
 Bachelor of Arts (Cultural Studies)
 Bachelor of Arts (Economics)
 Bachelor of Arts (Public Administration)
 Bachelor of Arts (Social Work)
 Bachelor of Business Management
 Bachelor of Education
 Bachelor of Education (Arts)
 Bachelor of Education (Early Childhood and Primary Education)
 Bachelor of Education (Guidance and Counseling)
 Bachelor of Education (Science)
 Bachelor of Education (Special Education)
 Bachelor of Environmental Science
  Bachelor of Hotels and Hospitality Management
 Bachelor of Human Resource Management
 Bachelor of Journalism and Mass Communication
 Bachelor of Science
 Bachelor of Science (Agricultural Economics and Resource Management)
 Bachelor of Science (Animal Science and Management)
 Bachelor of Science (Business Management)
 Bachelor of Science (Communication and Public Relations)
 Bachelor of Science (Computer Science)
 Bachelor of Science (Forestry)
 Bachelor of Science (Horticultural Science and Management)
 Bachelor of Science (Human Development Management)
 Bachelor of Science (Human Resource Management)
 Bachelor of Science (Information Science)
 Bachelor of Science (Media Science)
 Bachelor of Science (Seed Science and Technology)
 Bachelor of Science (Wildlife Management)
 Bachelor of Science in Applied Statistic With Computing
 Bachelor of Tourism and Travel Management
 Bachelor of Tourism Management

Postgraduate
As of May 2021, the university offers the following postgraduate degree courses.

 Master in Education
 Master of Arts (Economics)
 Master of Education (Curriculum Instruction and Education Media)
 Master of Education (Education Administration)
 Master of Hospitality Management
 Master of Philosophy in Curriculum Development
 Master of Philosophy in Early Childhood Education
 Master of Philosophy in Economics of Education
 Master of Philosophy in Educational Administration
 Master of Philosophy in Educational Planning
 Master of Philosophy in Guidance and Counselling
 Master of Philosophy in Human Resource Development
 Master of Philosophy in Wildlife Management
 Master of Tourism Management
 Masters in Business Management
 Masters in Human Resource Management
 Masters of Education (Educational Foundations)
 Doctor of Philosophy in Business Management
 Doctor of Philosophy in Human Resource Management
 Doctor of Philosophy in Curriculum Studies
 Doctor of Philosophy in Education Psychology
 Doctor of Philosophy in Educational Administration

Other courses
In addition to undergraduate and postgraduate degrees, MMU offers Certificate and Diploma courses in many of the same subjects.

Other considerations
In May 2021, Professor Kitche Magak, the Acting Vice Chancellor of MMU, a specialist in human reproductive health, announced in Kenyan print media, that the university was in the process of launching the manufacture of re-usable sanitary towels. The towels would be distributed to girls from low income families, who otherwise could not afford them.

Other collaborators in this female sanitary towels project include (a) Chris Kirubi, an industrialist and philanthropist (b) Jennifer Riria PhD, a businesswoman, banker and corporate executive, who serves as the CEO of Kenya Women Holding Group (now Echo Network Africa Limited) and (c) Bedi Investments Limited, a textiles and garments manufacturer. They have donated industrial machinery to the project.

See also
 List of universities in Kenya

References

External links
 Official Website
 Brief Overview
  Maasai Mara University VC, four others held at Nakuru Police station awaiting plea-taking As of 26 August 2020.

Universities and colleges in Kenya
Educational institutions established in 2008
2008 establishments in Kenya